Xiasha may refer to:
Xiasha Subdistrict (p Xiàshā,  "Lower Sands"), a subdistrict of Qiantang District, Hangzhou, in Zhejiang Province, China.
 Xiasha (Shanghai), one of the shoals composing Jiuduansha, in Shanghai, China
 Xiasha station (Shanghai Metro), a metro station in Shanghai, China
 Xiasha station (Shenzhen Metro), a metro station in Shenzhen, China
 West Xiasha station, a metro station in Hangzhou, China
 Xiasha Jiangbin station, another metro station in Hangzhou, China

See also
 Xisha (disambiguation)